The ninth season of the American reality television series Food Network Star premiered Sunday, June 2, 2013.

Season 8 chef mentors Bobby Flay, Giada De Laurentiis, and Alton Brown returned for season 9, but they were not assigned to a team nor did they hold a final elimination challenge between the bottom contestants. Season 9 featured 12 contestants, just three short of the prior season.

Contestants

Winner
Damaris Phillips, 31 , Culinary Teacher - Louisville, Kentucky

Runner-Up
 Rodney Henry, 47, Pie Shop Owner - Baltimore, Maryland
 Russell Jackson, 49, Underground Chef - San Francisco, California

Eliminated
(In order of elimination)
Daniela Perez-Reyes, 28, Caterer/Bartender - Haleiwa, Hawaii
Andres Guillama, 26, Childhood Obesity Prevention Coach - Waynesville, North Carolina
Danushka Lysek, 37, Private Chef/Model - New York City
 Connie "Lovely" Jackson, 27, Caterer - Los Angeles, California (Returned to competition after winning Star Salvation)
Viet Pham, 33, Chef/Restaurant Owner - Salt Lake City, Utah
Chris Hodgson, 26, Chef/Restaurateur - Cleveland, Ohio
 Chad Rosenthal, 37, Restaurant Owner - Ambler, Pennsylvania
 Connie "Lovely" Jackson, 27, Caterer - Los Angeles, California
Nikki Dinki, 29, Food Blogger/Online Host - New York City
 Stacey Poon-Kinney, 34, Restaurant Owner - San Diego, California

At least six competitors have appeared on other Food Network programs. Pham defeated Bobby Flay on Iron Chef America and also competed on Extreme Chef. Lysek and Henry appeared on Chopped; both were eliminated before the final round. Henry also appeared on Throwdown with Bobby Flay, while Lysek also won during an appearance on 24 Hour Restaurant Battle. Poon-Kinney appeared on Restaurant: Impossible, where Robert Irvine gave her family's restaurant a makeover. Hodgson competed on The Great Food Truck Race; his truck, Hodge Podge, was a runner-up on season 2.

Contestant progress

: Lovely won Star Salvation and returned to the competition, but was eliminated the same week she came back.
: Russell was eliminated from the final three midway through the finale.
 (WINNER) The contestant won the competition and became the next "Food Network Star".
 (RUNNER-UP) The contestant made it to the finale, but could not make it.
 (WIN) The contestant won the 'Star Challenge' for that week.
 (SAFE) The contestant won 'immunity' from elimination by winning the Camera Challenge.
 (HIGH) The contestant was one of the Selection Committee's favorites for that week.
 (IN) The contestant was not one of the Selection Committee's favorites nor their least favorites. They were not up for elimination.
 (LOW) The contestant was one of the Selection Committee's three or four least favorites for that week, but was not eliminated.
 (LOW) The contestant was one of the Selection Committee's two least favorites for that week, but was not eliminated.
 (OUT) The contestant was the Selection Committee's least favorite for that week, and was eliminated.

Episode summaries

Week One: Are You Ready For Prime-Time?
Camera Challenge: The 12 contestants must make a 30-second pitch to network executives Bob Tuschman and Susie Fogelson; the pitch is also shown to a focus group, who are given reaction meters to rate their impressions. Following this, they have 45 minutes to create a dish that highlights potatoes.
Top 3: Chad, Nikki, and Stacey
Bottom 3: Russell, Danushka, and Daniela
Eliminated: Daniela
Original air date: June 2, 2013

Week Two: Burger Bash
Camera Challenge: The contestants must make a burger for 100 burger enthusiasts and make a two-minute presentation to the audience.  Each audience member has a token and will give their token to the contestant whose burger they want to taste.
Top 3: Russell, Chad, and Stacey
Bottom 3: Nikki, Danushka, and Andres
Eliminated: Andres
Original air date: June 9, 2013

Week Three: A Star is Chopped
Mentor Challenge: The contestants are separated into two groups, led by Alton and Bobby, and must prepare a dish using an exotic ingredient. The winners from each group receive an advantage in the next challenge.
 Team Alton winner: Rodney
 Team Bobby winner: Damaris
Chopped Challenge: The contestants face the Chopped Challenge, in which Iron Chef Alex Guarnaschelli, Alton and Bobby judge two heats of a Chopped-style competition. For winning the Mentor Challenge, Damaris and Rodney earn a place on the judging panel for their respective teams and are safe from elimination.
Round 1: Viet, Danushka, Chad and Russell face off against one another using foods found at a baseball game: cotton candy, hot dogs, peanuts and beer. Damaris joins the judges for this heat.
Round 2: Chris, Lovely, Nikki and Stacey face off against one another using kids' foods: chicken nuggets, fruit leathers, cheddar fish crackers and apple juice. Rodney joins the judges for this heat.
Top 2: Nikki and Chad
Bottom 3: Stacey, Russell, and Danushka
Eliminated: Danushka
Original air date: June 16, 2013

Week Four: Big Screen Bites
Camera Challenge: The contestants are divided into teams of three, each representing a classic movie theme. The teams, who will compete at a luxury cinema, must create a menu and a movie trailer based on their theme.
Teams:
Musical: Lovely, Rodney, and Chris
Western: Stacey, Nikki, and Russell
Romance: Damaris, Viet, and Chad
Top 3: Nikki, Russell, and Stacey
Bottom 3: Viet, Rodney, and Lovely
Eliminated: Lovely
Original air date: June 23, 2013

Week Five: 4th of July "Live"
Mentor Challenge: The contestants work with Terrence Jenkins to present live demos of a sausage and pepper sandwich in three minutes. Each contestant is challenged with a different issue during their demonstration including missing peppers, cutting the lights and Terrence walking off the set with a cough. 
Winner: Rodney
Camera Challenge: The contestants take part in an interactive show called "4th of July Live." As part of the show, network executive Bob Tuschman returns to judge the challenge. Each of the contestants will be given one of eight stations which range from cooking to a station with a culinary expert.

Top 2: Stacey and Nikki 
Winner: Stacey
Bottom 2: Russell and Viet 
Eliminated: Viet
Original air date: June 30, 2013

Week Six: Product Pitch

Star Challenge:  The finalists are given one hour to create two potential food products that can be sold on the market. They must then choose which one they will take to market and will have the opportunity to pitch their product to three executives from Kraft Foods, Kellogg's and Target.
Top 3: Damaris, Stacey and Russell
Bottom 4: Nikki, Chad, Rodney and Chris
Eliminated: Chris
Original air date: July 7, 2013

Week Seven: Star Charity Auction
 Camera Challenge: The contestants had to describe Bobby Flay's dish after tasting it and were buzzed by Bobby Flay when they used certain words that were forbidden to use.
Top 2: Stacey and Nikki
Winner: Stacey
Bottom 2: Rodney and Russell
 Star Challenge: The finalists create their signature dish to tell what type of Food Network Star they are, they then had to describe the dish to a group of adventurous eaters (gastronauts). The dishes were then bid on by the eaters. Whoever earns the highest bid is safe from elimination. For winning the Camera Challenge, Stacey won an extra $10 added on to whatever amount her dish receives in the auction. All proceeds went to Share Our Strength, an organization to combat childhood hunger.
 Dishes and Bids:
 Damaris: (Green Bean Casserole) $130
 Nikki:  (Mushroom & Shrimp Pasta) $130
 Chad: (Texas Barbecue Poutine) $150
 Russell: (Egg & Bacon Revolution) $150
 Stacey: (Maple Bacon Cheesecake) $180 + $10 bonus
 Rodney: (Berry & Rhubarb Pie) $140
Top 3: Nikki, Damaris, and Stacey
Winner: Nikki
Bottom 2: Russell and Chad
Eliminated: Chad
Original air date: July 14, 2013

Week Eight: Food Stories From The Road
Prior to the announcement of the Mentors Challenge, Robert Irvine announced the winner of the Star Salvation was Lovely, who returned to the competition.

 Mentors Challenge: The contestants had to create an Italian dish for the mentors and then had to come up with a tasty description for the dish. As a twist, two contestants at a time are brought in and then the two chefs would switch dishes and describe each others. Damaris and Lovely described each other's dishes, Stacey and Rodney judge one another, and Russell and Nikki critique theirs. The winner would receive an advantage in the upcoming Star Challenge.
Winner: Nikki
 Star Challenge: In teams of three, the finalists must film a three-minute "food story show." Nikki, Stacey and Damaris are paired with The Donut Man, while Lovely, Russell and Rodney take Vito's Pizza. Guest judges Janice Min, Gary Baum and Leslie Bruce from The Hollywood Reporter screen and critique the shows; the least successful team lands in the bottom three.  
Top 2: Damaris and Nikki
Bottom 3: Rodney, Russell and Lovely
Eliminated: Lovely
 Original air date: July 21, 2013

Week Nine: Menu: Impossible
 Mentor's Challenge: The chefs are asked create a well-balanced dish in 30 minutes using ingredients from the Food Network Star pantry. During their presentation to Alton, the contestants must explain why they used the ingredients and give a tip for preparing a quick meal. Rodney and Damaris are assigned breakfast dishes, Nikki receives lunch and Russell and Stacey prepare food for dinner.
Winner: Stacey
 Star Challenge: The contestants head to Phil Trani's in Long Beach, California. Restaurant: Impossible host Robert Irvine, along with owner Phil Trani and managers Amber and Ashley, joins Alton and Giada on the judging panel. Irvine challenges the chefs to reinvent failing or outdated dishes on the restaurant's menu. For winning the Mentor's Challenge, Stacey is presented five dishes and given the opportunity to either cook the dish or assign it to another chef. Rodney, assigned chicken cacciatore, serves the judges a chicken cacciatore pie. Damaris, assigned tournedos of beef and mashed potatoes, serves a filet with garlic smashed potatoes. Stacey, who chose crab-stuffed halibut with a baked potato, serves a halibut crab cake roulade with potatoes. Nikki, assigned the salmon with onion pepper relish and a rice pilaf, serves a broccoli cake with salmon and rice pilaf. Russell, assigned stuffed chicken and rice pilaf, serves a spinach wrapped chicken and risotto. 
Winner: Russell
Bottom 4: Damaris, Stacey, Rodney and Nikki
Eliminated: Nikki
 Original air date: July 28, 2013

Week Ten: Network Pitch
 Pitch Challenge: The final four contestants each pitch two show ideas to the mentors. They then must pitch their best idea to network executives Bob Tuschman and Susie Fogelson, who will green-light three of the pilots. Stacey pitches "Stacey's Modern Magic," where she'll take dishes that have "fallen into disrepair" and make them more magical. Russell pitches "Guilty Pleasures," which would turn something ordinary and plain into a "sinful delight," such as adding bacon to an ice cream shop's vanilla ice cream. Damaris pitches "Eat, Date, Love" which would teach men, and America in general, how to win someone over through Southern food and tradition. Finally, Rodney pitches "Pie Style," which takes him to restaurants that would will challenge him to turn their signature dish in into a pie. The executives and mentors unanimously put Damaris and Rodney through to the next challenge. The decision on the third finalist results in a tie between Stacey and Russell, with Alton yet to vote. Stacey ends up being eliminated.
Moved to next round: Damaris, Rodney, Russell
Eliminated: Stacey
 Star Challenge: The final three head out to do their pilots, which will be directed by surprise guest and former Food Network Star winner Guy Fieri. Rodney meets chef Eric Greenspan at The Foundry on Melrose, where he'll remake Greenspan's famous grilled cheese sandwich into a pie using Taleggio cheese and short ribs. Russell shoots his pilot at Bennett's Ice Cream Shop inside the Original Farmers Market in Los Angeles, where he tries the cabernet sauvignon sorbet. He then enters the kitchen to create his own bacon bourbon sorbet for owner Scott Bennett to try. For Damaris' pilot, she and her student, Josh, create a peppered pork loin on a sweet potato biscuit. Each pilots is shown at the end of the episode: "Pie Style with Rodney Henry," "Guilty Pleasures with Russell Jackson," and "Eat, Date, Love with Damaris Phillips." Now the viewers will vote for their favorite contestant through the Food Network's website: Finale Vote.
 Original air date: August 4, 2013

Week Eleven: America Picks a Star
 Reunion: The Season Nine winner is announced during a reunion show at Chelsea Manor in New York featuring never-before-seen footage and reflections from the competitors and mentors. The contestants and mentors answer questions sent by viewers via Twitter, Skype and email. Midway through the show, Russell is eliminated from the final three, leaving Damaris and Rodney as the final two contestants for the grand prize.
 Runners-Up: Russell (third place), Rodney (second place)
 Winner of Food Network Star: Damaris
 New Show: Southern at Heart
 Original air date: August 11, 2013

Star Salvation
This season, Food Network Star added a five-week online "Star Salvation" competition, which will allow one eliminated contestant a second chance to return to the main competition. Hosted by Robert Irvine, each episode will feature the most recently eliminated contestant competing against the remaining previously eliminated contestants. Each episode features one or two rounds of competition, judged by Irvine.

 (WIN) The chef won Star Salvation and returned to the main competition.
 (WIN) The chef won that episode's Star Salvation and continued in the competition.
 (IN) The chef continued in the competition.
 (OUT) The chef lost in that week's Star Salvation and was eliminated from the competition.

Episode 1

Round 1
 Advanced: Andres, Danushka, Lovely
 Eliminated: Daniela

Round 2
 Advanced: Danushka and Lovely
 Eliminated: Andres

Episode 2
 Winner: Lovely
 Eliminated:  Danushka and Viet

Episode 3
Winner: Lovely
Eliminated: Chris

Episode 4
Winner: Lovely
Eliminated: Chad

References

External links
 
 

Food Network Star
2013 American television seasons